Peter Bernard Luccin (born 9 April 1979) is a French former professional footballer who played as a defensive midfielder. He currently serves as an assistant coach with MLS side FC Dallas.

After arriving in Spain at age 22, he went on to appear in more than 300 official matches for a handful of clubs in the country. In La Liga, he amassed totals of 239 games and 11 goals over the course of eight seasons, spending three years apiece with Celta and Atlético Madrid.

Club career

Luccin was born in Marseille. After emerging through AS Cannes' youth system he appeared in his country for FC Girondins de Bordeaux, Olympique de Marseille and Paris Saint-Germain FC (where he collected 13 yellow cards during the 2000–01 season).

Luccin's first adventure abroad came in summer 2001 when he arrived on loan to Celta de Vigo, which later became permanent. In July 2004 he transferred to fellow La Liga club Atlético Madrid from relegated Celta (even though he scored a career-best five goals that season, also being sent off twice). He helped the Colchoneros qualify to the UEFA Cup in the 2006–07 campaign and, during his three-year spell, appeared in an average of 30 games per season, receiving 39 yellow cards and five red in the process.

Luccin was signed by Real Zaragoza at the last minute of the transfer window in August 2007, rejoining his former Celta coach Víctor Fernández. During that season the team dropped down a level and he picked 14 yellow cards, receiving his marching orders in a 3–3 home draw with RCD Espanyol.

Again, on the last day of the summer transfer window, Racing de Santander completed the signing of Luccin from relegated Zaragoza – he signed a one-year loan at El Sardinero, seen as a direct replacement for Aldo Duscher who joined Sevilla FC at the same time. Returning to the Aragonese after an irregular 2008–09 he missed the entire campaign due to injury, and left the team after 2009–10.

In July 2010, Luccin had a trial with Scottish Premier League side Celtic, but nothing came of it. In October 2011, after nearly two years away from competitive football, he signed for FC Lausanne-Sport in the Swiss Super League.

In April 2012, Luccin left Lausanne after reportedly falling out with the club. He signed with Major League Soccer's FC Dallas on 10 December, leaving two years later after the team declined the option to retain him.

International career
Luccin played for France in the 1997 FIFA World Youth Championship, as the youngest member for the eventual quarter-finalists.

References

External links

Celta de Vigo biography 

1979 births
Living people
French people of Martiniquais descent
Footballers from Marseille
French footballers
Association football midfielders
Ligue 1 players
AS Cannes players
FC Girondins de Bordeaux players
Olympique de Marseille players
Paris Saint-Germain F.C. players
La Liga players
Segunda División players
RC Celta de Vigo players
Atlético Madrid footballers
Real Zaragoza players
Racing de Santander players
Swiss Super League players
FC Lausanne-Sport players
Major League Soccer players
FC Dallas players
France youth international footballers
French expatriate footballers
Expatriate footballers in Spain
Expatriate footballers in Switzerland
Expatriate soccer players in the United States
French expatriate sportspeople in Spain
French expatriate sportspeople in the United States
FC Dallas non-playing staff